Elaphria guttula is a moth of the family Noctuidae. It is found on the Antilles.

Taxonomy
The species was incorrectly synonymized with Elaphria agrotina for some time.

References

Moths described in 1868
Caradrinini